The novelty effect, in the context of human performance, is the tendency for performance to initially improve when new technology is instituted, not because of any actual improvement in learning or achievement, but in response to increased interest in the new technology.

The Metropolitan Education and Research Consortium of the Virginia Commonwealth University states, "While it is possible that higher attention spans can be attributed to novelty effect, even after the initial novelty wears off, the level of interest in the automated workbook is still greater than that in the regular workbook. The increased attention by students sometimes results in increased effort or persistence, which yields achievement gains. If they are due to a novelty effect, these gains tend to diminish as students become more familiar with the new medium. This was the case in reviews of computer-assisted instruction at the secondary school level, grades 6 to 12".

In context of (clinical or biological) psychology 
The novelty effect is the tendency for an individual to have the strongest stress response the first time that individual is faced with a potentially threatening experience. Over time, as the novelty wears off, the stress response decreases. This is a threat to external validity when individuals participating in a research study (a novel situation) perceive and respond differently than they would in the normal real world.

See also
Hawthorne effect (observer effect)

References

External links 

https://web.archive.org/web/20070503091246/http://www.soe.vcu.edu/merc/briefs/brief4.htm (accessed April 14, 2007)

Learning